Dina Mann (born 1951), also credited as Diana Mann, is an Australian actress and casting director recognised for several television soap opera and film roles  starting from 1970 until 1985, after which she worked as a casting director until 2014. She is probably best known for her role as Debbie Chester in the latter years of TV serial Number 96 in which she featured from 1975 and 1977, through 137 episodes.

Career 
In the 1970s Mann appeared in numerous character roles and specialised in playing characters much younger than herself in adult-themed dramas and comedies. Her roles in Australian television programs, including several appearances in the Crawford Productions police dramas Homicide, Division 4 and Matlock Police, were nearly all teenage characters. Her first television role was in an episode of Delta where she played a 15-year-old who appeared in a semi-nude swimming scene. Mann also played a schoolgirl in the hit sex-comedy feature film Alvin Purple (1973) and was a young female cricketer in its 1974 sequel Alvin Purple Rides Again.

She later played the more  permanent role of schoolgirl Debbie Chester in adult soap opera Number 96. She joined the show in late 1975 as part of a new family that was introduced which included Suzanne Church (born United Kingdom, 9 October 1951) as her sister Jane Chester and former radio actress Patti Crocker as her mum Eileen Chester, she continued until its final episode in August 1977. She subsequently played guest roles in prison-based soap opera  Prisoner, first appearing as the rebellious Debbie, the daughter of Ken Pearce (Tom Oliver), in 1980 and again in 1981. She reappeared in the series in 1983 playing a different character, and made other guest appearances in Australian television series until the mid-1980s.

Since the mid-1980s she has worked as a casting director on various Australian films and television productions

Filmography

References

External links

1950 births
Living people
Australian television actresses
20th-century Australian actresses
21st-century Australian women
21st-century Australian people